Myrmecozela is a genus of moths belonging to the family Tineidae erected by Philipp Christoph Zeller.

Species

Myrmecozela armeniaca Zagulajev, 1971
Myrmecozela asariella Zagulajev, 1972
Myrmecozela ataxella (Chrétien, 1905) (=Myrmecozela chneourella (Lucas, 1950))
Myrmecozela carabachica Zagulajev, 1968
Myrmecozela caustocoma Meyrick, 1928
Myrmecozela changaicus Zagulajev, 1997
Myrmecozela climacodes (Meyrick, 1925)
Myrmecozela corymbota Meyrick, 1919
Myrmecozela cuencella (Caradja, 1920)
Myrmecozela curtella Tengström, 1869
Myrmecozela deserticola Walsingham, 1907
Myrmecozela diacona Walsingham, 1907
Myrmecozela dzhungarica Zagulajev, 1971
Myrmecozela erecta Braun, 1923
Myrmecozela gajndzhiella Zagulajev, 1968
Myrmecozela heptapotamica Zagulajev, 1971
Myrmecozela hispanella Zagulajev, 1971
Myrmecozela hyrcanella Zagulajev, 1968
Myrmecozela imeretica Zagulajev, 1972
Myrmecozela isopsamma Meyrick, 1920 (=Myrmecozela ethiopica Gozmány, 1960, Myrmecozela pelochlora (Meyrick, 1920), Myrmecozela philoptica Meyrick, 1920)
Myrmecozela kasachstanica Zagulajev, 1972
Myrmecozela lambesella Rebel, 1901 (=Myrmecozela cuencella (Petersen, 1957))
Myrmecozela lutosella (Eversmann, 1844) (= Myrmecozela stichograpta (Meyrick, 1936), Myrmecozela centrogramma (Meyrick, 1921), Myrmecozela gigantea (Christoph, 1873), Myrmecozela insignis (Amsel, 1935))
Myrmecozela mongolica Petersen, 1965
Myrmecozela ochraceella (Tengström, 1848)
Myrmecozela ordubasis Zagulajev, 1968
Myrmecozela parnassiella Rebel, 1915
Myrmecozela paurosperma Meyrick, 1926
Myrmecozela pogonopis Meyrick, 1926
Myrmecozela pontica Zagulajev, 1971
Myrmecozela rjabovi Zagulajev, 1968
Myrmecozela samurensis Zagulajev, 1997
Myrmecozela saule Zagulajev, 1972
Myrmecozela stepicola Zagulajev, 1972
Myrmecozela taurella Zagulajev, 1971

References

Myrmecozelinae
Tineidae genera
Taxa named by Philipp Christoph Zeller